Strikeforce: Playboy Mansion  was a mixed martial arts event promoted by Strikeforce. The event took place on September 29, 2007 at the Playboy Mansion in Los Angeles, California. The invitation-only event drew nearly 1,000 spectators who paid $1000 per ticket. The event was supervised by the California State Athletic Commission. Fights 5 to 12 were streamed live on Yahoo Sports for free.

Results

Purses

•Gilbert Melendez $30,000 (no win bonus) def. Tetsuji Kato $6,000

•Joe Riggs $29,500 ($15,000 win bonus) def. Eugene Jackson $15,000

•Josh Thomson $24,500 ($10,000 win bonus) def. Adam Lynn $6,000

•Billy Evangelista $6,000 ($3,000 win bonus) def. Clint Coronel $3,000

•Jorge Masvidal $18,182.50 (no win bonus) def. Matt Lee $1,000

•Bobby Southworth $20,000 ($10,000 win bonus) def. Bill Mahood $1,000

•Falaniko Vitale $20,000, (no win bonus) def. Ron Fields $7,000

•Daniel Puder $20,000 (no win bonus) def. Richard Dalton $3,000

•Dewey Cooper $500 (no win bonus) def. Adam Smith $500

•Daniel McWilliams $1,000(no win bonus) def. Eddy Millis $4,000

•Luke Stewart $7,500 ($4,000 win bonus) def. Sam Liera $3,000

The payout totaled $229,183.50.

See also
 Strikeforce
 List of Strikeforce champions
 List of Strikeforce events
 2007 in Strikeforce

References

Playboy Mansion
2007 in mixed martial arts
Mixed martial arts in Los Angeles
2007 in sports in California